Julian David Cole (April 2, 1925 – April 17, 1999) was an American mathematician. He is known for his groundbreaking work in mathematical applications to aerodynamics and transonic flow, and in non-linear equations more generally. He graduated 36 PhD students and won many of the most significant scientific honors over his career, including simultaneous election to the National Academy of Sciences and National Academy of Engineering in 1976.

Biography
Cole earned an undergraduate degree in engineering from Cornell, after which he entered Caltech as a graduate student. He worked with Hans Liepmann and Paco Lagerstrom, the latter his advisor, submitting a dissertation on transonic flow in 1949. Lagerstrom and Cole continued their work, having formed a small research group at GALCIT to better understand the mathematics of fluid flow. These two, along with Leon Trilling found that flows having weak shocks could be described by Burgers' equation, for which Cole later found a clever transformation to solve it. Cole continued to delve deeper into this topic for the next decade.

Cole took sabbatical in 1963–1964 at Harvard, where he wrote a book on this body of work: Perturbation Methods in Applied Mathematics.

Cole is the namesake of the Society for Industrial and Applied Mathematics's Julian Cole Lectureship.

Awards
 Fellow, American Academy of Arts and Sciences
 Fellow, American Institute of Aeronautics and Astronautics
 Fellow, American Physical Society
 National Academy of Engineering
 National Academy of Sciences

References

External links
 

Fellows of the American Academy of Arts and Sciences
Fellows of the American Institute of Aeronautics and Astronautics
Fellows of the American Physical Society
Members of the United States National Academy of Sciences
Members of the United States National Academy of Engineering
Rensselaer Polytechnic Institute faculty
Cornell University alumni
California Institute of Technology alumni
1925 births
1999 deaths
Fluid dynamicists